A Beacon from Mars is Kaleidoscope's second album. It was published in January 1968 by Epic Records along with the single "I Found Out" b/w "Rampè Rampè". At the time it was released it received good reviews, but like Kaleidoscope's other albums, it was commercially unsuccessful.

Reception

Allmusic's retrospective review hailed the album as flawless brilliance, "the best non-compilation showcase of Kaleidoscope's legendary eclecticism and versatility." They noted the many styles represented by each of the songs, and deemed that "Every one of these disparate styles is performed with authority and commitment, and the result still has the power to amaze." The track "Taxim" is based on "Şehnaz Longa", a Turkish piece by Santuri Ethem Efendi.  A 1968 music reviewer stated: "“Here is the most versatile band we have ever heard. You want ragtime? Listen to 'Baldheaded End Of A Broom' which brings back early Spoonful fun. Lovely bass, good mandolin and harmonica. How about authentic hillbilly music? 'Louisiana Man' hunts muskrats in the swamps to bagpipe-sounding fiddles, embellished in drums, of course. Or hard blues? They make good use of their instruments. fuzzed up on the tense, electric 'You Don't Love Me'. High register harmonica screams over a heavy swing bottom. Excellent tension contrasts. 'I Found Out' is a medium tempo folkish tune. 'Greenwood Side', is a slow, emotional Scottish ballad of death, again with bagpipe fiddles and death roll drums. 'Life Will Pass You By', is a Byrd-like song with hillbilly twang harmony and mandolin. 'Taxim' is a long oriental-sounding instrumental, featuring excellent musicianship on caz, oud, harp guitar.”

Track listing

Personnel
David Lindley – guitar, banjo, fiddle, mandolin
Chris Darrow – bass, vocals, guitar, mandolin
Solomon Feldthouse – vocals, saz, bouzouki, dobro, vina, oud, doumbek, dulcimer, fiddle, guitar
Chester Crill (as Max Buda) – violin, viola, bass, organ, piano, harmonica
John Vidican – drums, percussion

References

1968 albums
Kaleidoscope (American band) albums
Epic Records albums